The Tuvalu Ship Registry is the body appointed by the government of Tuvalu to register ships under the Tuvalu flag.

Function
The ship registry was launched in 2004 and is located in Singapore and operated by Tuvalu Ship Registry Pte Ltd. The ship registry is managed on behalf of the Tuvalu Government by Sovereign Ventures (SV) Pte Ltd.

The responsibilities of the Registry include:
The registration and licensing of ships
The certification of seafarers
The inspection of vessels to ensure compliance with safety and environmental standards.

Vessels registered 
Total: 245

By type: bulk carrier 18, container ship 2, general cargo 36, oil tanker 27, other 162 (2017)

Reflagging of Iranian vessels
Tuvalu entered the international spotlight in 2012 when ships that were sailing under the flag of Iran were registered in the Tuvalu Ship Registry. In response to the European boycott of Iranian oil exports over Iran's nuclear policy, a number of oil tankers changed to Tuvalu flags. According to Radio Australia, this could lead to unforeseen consequences for the small nation. The Iranian vessels were accepted by Tuvalu Ship Registry as they were earlier flagged under Malta and Cyprus flags which were well-known reputable flags. However, upon further understanding that the vessels were actually sanctioned by the US and EU, the Government of Tuvalu took swift action to instruct the Tuvalu Ship Registry to de-register all possible Iranian-linked vessels on 16 August 2012. The Iranian-linked vessels were de-registered by 21 September 2012 and press releases of the actions taken by the Tuvalu Ship Registry are posted on its website. The Iranian vessels were later rumored to have gone to other flags such as Tanzania, Mongolia and others.

References

External links
Effect of sanctions 'like war' says Iran's Ahmadinejad at WikiNews, 2012.
Tuvalu Ship Registry Official Website.
Tuvalu Ship Registry Press Release relating to Iranian vessels 16 August 2012.

Organizations based in Tuvalu
Economy of Tuvalu
Ship registration
2004 establishments in Tuvalu